John Leslie Peck (7 August 1937 – 2 February 1993) was an Australian rules footballer, who played in the Victorian Football League (VFL).

Football

Hawthorn
John Peck, the brother of Graham Peck, played for Hawthorn from 1954 to 1966.

He was the first Hawthorn  player to win the leading VFL goalkicking award. Peck won the award in three successive years in 1963–65. He Kicked 78 goals in 1963, 66 goals in 1964 and 58 goals in 1965. In 1960 Peck kicked the winning goal in a match against Collingwood at Victoria Park, It was Hawthorn's first win after 35 years at that venue. Peck was the last player to win the Coleman Medal from the wooden spoon winning side until Brendan Fevola from  won it in 2006. 

He played in the 1961 and 1963 Grand Finals.

Brian Sawley
In the third quarter of the interstate match between Victoria and South Australia in Adelaide on 7 July 1963, playing in the ruck, Peck knocked Norwood's Brian Sawley unconscious.

A South Australian Tribunal found Peck guilty of striking, but left the penalty to be determined by the VFL — displaying controversial leniency, the VFL only suspended Peck for two weeks.

Port Melbourne
He played for Port Melbourne in the Victorian Football Association in 1967 and 1968. Most notably during his time at Port Melbourne, Peck was reported for abusing and disputing the decisions of field umpire David Jackson in the second quarter of the controversial 1967 VFA Grand Final; the incident prompted captain-coach Brian Buckley to lead the Port Melbourne team off the ground (a forfeiture was averted when club officials instructed the players to return to the field), and Peck was suspended for six matches for the incident.

Honours and achievements
Hawthorn
 VFL premiership player: 1961
 2× Minor premiership: 1961, 1963

Individual
 3× Coleman Medal: 1963, 1964, 1965
 8× Hawthorn leading goalkicker: 1956, 1958, 1961, 1962, 1963, 1964, 1965, 1966
 Hawthorn captain: 1965
 Hawthorn Hall of Fame
 Hawthorn life member

Death
Peck died suddenly on 2 February 1993 from a heart attack at the age of 55. His death was received with great sadness within the footy community, and he was buried at the Euroa Public Cemetery.

See also
1967 VFA Grand Final

Footnotes

References
 Ross, J. (ed), 100 Years of Australian Football 1897–1996: The Complete Story of the AFL, All the Big Stories, All the Great Pictures, All the Champions, Every AFL Season Reported, Viking, (Ringwood), 1996.

External links

 
 Boyles Football Photos: John Peck
Profile on menziesera

Australian rules footballers from Victoria (Australia)
Hawthorn Football Club players
Hawthorn Football Club Premiership players
Coleman Medal winners
Port Melbourne Football Club players
1937 births
1993 deaths
One-time VFL/AFL Premiership players
Burials in Victoria (Australia)